The 2001 Carolina Dodge Dealers 400 was the fifth stock car race of the 2001 NASCAR Winston Cup Series and the 45th iteration of the event. The race was held on Sunday, March 18, 2001, in Darlington, South Carolina, at Darlington Raceway, a  permanent egg-shaped oval racetrack. The race took the scheduled 293 laps to complete. In the final laps of the race, Robert Yates Racing driver Dale Jarrett would manage to hold off the field on the final restart with seven to go to take his 25th career NASCAR Winston Cup Series victory and his first victory of the season. To fill out the top three, Dale Earnhardt, Inc. driver Steve Park and Penske Racing South driver Jeremy Mayfield would finish second and third, respectively.

Background 

Darlington Raceway is a race track built for NASCAR racing located near Darlington, South Carolina. It is nicknamed "The Lady in Black" and "The Track Too Tough to Tame" by many NASCAR fans and drivers and advertised as "A NASCAR Tradition." It is of a unique, somewhat egg-shaped design, an oval with the ends of very different configurations, a condition which supposedly arose from the proximity of one end of the track to a minnow pond the owner refused to relocate. This situation makes it very challenging for the crews to set up their cars' handling in a way that is effective at both ends.

Entry list 

 (R) denotes rookie driver.

Practice

First practice 
The first practice session was held on Saturday, March 17, at 7:45 AM EST. The session would last for one hour and 45 minutes.

Final practice 
The final practice session, sometimes referred to as Happy Hour, was held on Saturday, March 17, after the preliminary 2001 SunCom 200 NASCAR Busch Series race. The session would last for one hour.

Qualifying 
Qualifying was originally scheduled to be held on Saturday, March 17, at 10:40 AM EST. However, due to intense fog, qualifying was cancelled and the lineup was set by the current 2001 owner's points. Per the NASCAR rules at the time, the first 35 spots were determined by the owner's points standings. Then, the next few positions were given to cars who had won the year before, but had not qualified in the top 35. The rest of the starting lineup was then determined by who had attempted to qualify for the previous four races by order of owner's points. As a result, Hendrick Motorsports driver Jeff Gordon would earn the pole.

Three drivers would fail to qualify: Dave Marcis, Andy Houston, and Rick Mast.

Full starting lineup

Race results

References 

2001 NASCAR Winston Cup Series
NASCAR races at Darlington Raceway
March 2001 sports events in the United States
2001 in sports in South Carolina